Guavina is a genus of fishes in the family Eleotridae native to fresh, marine, and brackish waters of the Pacific and Atlantic coasts of the Americas.

Species
The recognized species in this genus are:
 Guavina guavina (Valenciennes, 1837) (guavina)
 Guavina micropus Ginsburg, 1953

References

Eleotridae